Growing may refer to:

 Growth (disambiguation)
 Growing (band), an American noise band
 Growing (Rina Chinen album), 1998
 Growing (Sleeping People album), 2007
 Growing, a 1961 autobiographical book by Leonard Woolf

See also
 
 
 Grow (disambiguation)